Year 1474 (MCDLXXIV) was a common year starting on Saturday (link will display the full calendar) of the Julian calendar.

Events 
 January–December 
 February – The Treaty of Utrecht puts an end to the Anglo-Hanseatic War.
 March 19 – The Senate of the Republic of Venice enacts the Venetian Patent Statute, one of the earliest patent systems in the world. New and inventive devices, once put into practice, have to be communicated to the Republic to obtain the right to prevent others from using them. This is considered the first modern patent system.
 July 25 – By signing the Treaty of London, Charles the Bold of Burgundy agrees to support Edward IV of England's planned invasion of France.
 December 12 – Upon the death of Henry IV of Castile, a civil war ensues between his designated successor Isabella I of Castile, and her niece Juana, who is supported by her husband, Afonso V of Portugal. Isabella wins the civil war after a lengthy struggle, when her husband, the newly crowned Ferdinand II of Aragon, comes to her aid.
 Date unknown 
 Marsilio Ficino completes his book Theologia Platonica (Platonic Theology).
 Axayacatl defeats the Matlatzinca of the Toluca Valley.

Births 
 January 7 – Thihathura II of Ava (d. 1501)
 March 1 – Angela Merici, Italian religious leader and saint (d. 1540)
 March 21 – Angela Merici, Italian religious leader and saint (d. 1540)
 May 5
 Juan Diego, Roman Catholic Saint from Mexico (d. 1548)
 Giovanni Stefano Ferrero, Italian cardinal (d. 1510)
 May 18 – Isabella d'Este, Marquise of Mantua (d. 1539)
 August 6 – Luigi de' Rossi, Italian cardinal (d. 1519)
 September 8 – Ludovico Ariosto, Italian poet (d. 1533)
 October 6 – Luigi d'Aragona, Italian cardinal (d. 1518)
 October 7 – Bernhard III, Margrave of Baden-Baden (d. 1536)
 October 13 – Mariotto Albertinelli, High Renaissance Italian painter of the Florentine school (d. 1515)
 November 7 – Lorenzo Campeggio, Italian Cardinal (d. 1539)
 November 8 – Francesco Vettori, Italian diplomat (d. 1539)
 November 11 – Bartolomé de las Casas, Spanish Dominican friar, historian, and social reformer (d. 1566)
 December 24 – Bartolomeo degli Organi, Italian musician (d. 1539)
 date unknown
 Anacaona, Taino queen and poet (d. 1503)
 Juan Diego, Mexican Catholic saint (d. 1548)
 Giacomo Pacchiarotti, Italian painter (d. 1539 or 1540)
 Cuthbert Tunstall, English bishop and diplomat (d. 1559)
 Humphrey Kynaston, English highwayman (d. 1534)
 probable
 Sebastian Cabot, Venetian explorer (d. c. 1557)
 Edward Guilford, Lord Warden of the Cinque Ports of England (d. 1534)
 Stephen Hawes, English poet (d. c. 1521)
 Sir John Seymour, English courtier (d. 1536)
 Perkin Warbeck, pretender to the throne of England (d. 1499)

Deaths 

 January 3 – Pietro Riario, Catholic cardinal (b. 1447)
 March 22 – Iacopo III Appiani, Prince of Piombino (b. 1422)
 April 14 – Anna of Brunswick-Grubenhagen, daughter of Duke Eric I of Brunswick-Grubenhagen (b. 1414)
 April 30 – Queen Gonghye, Korean royal consort (b. 1456)
 May 4 – Alain de Coëtivy, Catholic cardinal (b. 1407)
 May 9
 Alfonso Vázquez de Acuña, Roman Catholic prelate, Bishop of Jaén and Bishop of Mondoñedo (b. 1474)
 Peter von Hagenbach, Alsatian knight and ruler (b. 1423)
 May 11 – John Stanberry, Bishop of Hereford
 May 14 – Choe Hang, Korean politician (b. 1409)
 July 5 – Eric II, Duke of Pomerania-Wolgast (b. 1418)
 July 9 – Isotta degli Atti, Italian Renaissance woman (b. 1432)
 July 18 – Mahmud Pasha Angelović, Grand Vizier of the Ottoman Empire (b. 1420)
 August 1 – Walter Blount, 1st Baron Mountjoy, English politician (b. 1416)
 August 16 – Ricciarda of Saluzzo (b. 1410)
 August 26 – James III of Cyprus (b. 1473)
 September 21 – George I, Prince of Anhalt-Dessau (b. 1390)
 October 1 – Juan Pacheco, Spanish noble and politician (b. 1419)
 November – William Canynge, English merchant (b. c. 1399)
 November 27 – Guillaume Dufay, Flemish composer (b. 1397)
 December 1 – Nicolò Marcello, Doge of Venice (b. 1397)
 December 11 – King Henry IV of Castile (b. 1425)
 December 16 – Ali Qushji, Ottoman astronomer and mathematician (b. 1403)
 date unknown
 Gomes Eannes de Azurara, Portuguese chronicler (b. c. 1410)
 Antoinette de Maignelais, French royal favorite (b. 1434)
 Gendun Drup, 1st Dalai Lama (b. 1391)
 probable
 Walter Frye, English composer
 Jehan de Waurin, French chronicler

References